Catherine Cecil, Countess of Salisbury (c.1590 – January 1673), formerly Lady Catherine Howard, granddaughter of Thomas Howard, 4th Duke of Norfolk, member of the House of Howard and was the wife of William Cecil, 2nd Earl of Salisbury of Hatfield House.

She was a daughter of Thomas Howard, 1st Earl of Suffolk of Audley End House, and his second wife, the former Catherine Knyvett.

She married the future Earl of Salisbury on 1 December 1608, and became countess when he inherited the earldom on his father's death in 1612. Their children, several of whom died in infancy, were:

Hon. Robert Cecil
Hon. Philip Cecil
Hon. William Cecil
Hon. Edward Cecil
Lady Anne Cecil (1612-1637), who married Algernon Percy, 10th Earl of Northumberland, and had children
James Cecil, Viscount Cranborne (born and died 1616)
Lady Elizabeth Cecil (1619-1689), who married William Cavendish, 3rd Earl of Devonshire, and had children
Charles Cecil, Viscount Cranborne (1619-1660), who married Lady Diana Maxwell; their son became the 3rd Earl.
Lady Diana Cecil (1622-1633)
Lady Catherine Cecil (c.1628-1652), who married Philip Sydney, 3rd Earl of Leicester, and had children
Lady Mary Cecil (c.1631-c.1676), who married William Sandys, 1st/6th Baron Sandys, but had no children
Hon. Algernon Cecil (died 1676), who married Dorothy Nevile and had children

In 1615, the countess was present at Trinity College, Cambridge, for the performance of Aemilia by students, in the presence of King James I of England.
In 1617, the countess acted as godmother to James Murray, 2nd Earl of Tullibardine, the eldest son of Patrick Murray, 1st Earl of Tullibardine.

After Salisbury's retirement from public life, they made their home at Hatfield House. The countess's portrait was painted by Sir Peter Lely (some time after his arrival in England in 1641), and is held at Burghley House.

References

1590s births
1673 deaths
English countesses
Daughters of British earls